is an original Japanese anime television series that was produced by Kitty Films and was animated by Triangle Staff and aired from October 9, 1997 to April 2, 1998 on TV Asahi. The series later spawned a PlayStation video game, released on August 5, 1999 by Xing Entertainment. The game is a fantasy role-playing game where the player takes the role of a mermaid trying to find the secrets of her race. The game uses a turn-based fighting system with special moves and attacks.  The blocky graphics were typical for a PlayStation title of the era.

References

External links 
 

1997 anime television series debuts
TV Asahi original programming
1999 video games
Fantasy video games
Japan-exclusive video games
PlayStation (console) games
PlayStation (console)-only games
Role-playing video games
Video games based on anime and manga
Video games developed in Japan